The gens Asconia was a plebeian family at Rome during the first century AD.  It is known chiefly from a single individual, Quintus Asconius Pedianus, a commentator on Cicero.  There is some reason to believe that he was a native of Patavium, in which case the gens may be of Venetic or Etruscan origin.

See also
 List of Roman gentes

References

Roman gentes